The Perils of Pauline may refer to:

 The Perils of Pauline (1914 serial), a silent film serial
 The Perils of Pauline (1933 serial), a film serial from Universal Studios
 The Perils of Pauline (1947 film), from Paramount Pictures
 The Perils of Pauline (1967 film), from Universal Pictures